Bartolomeo Bianco (1590 – 1657) was an Italian architect of the early Baroque.

Born at Como, he was the designer of several palaces in Genoa, where he moved to follow his father, also an architect. His works include  the building which is now the centerpiece of the University of Genoa, the  Palazzo Balbi at Campomorone and the Palazzo Rocca at Chiavari.

He died in the second year of the two-year plague outbreak that halved the population of the city.

See also 
 Luigi Baccio del Bianco (contemporary painter and architect conflated with Bartolomeo Bianco)

1590 births
1657 deaths
People from Como
Italian Baroque architects
17th-century deaths from plague (disease)
17th-century Italian architects
People of the Republic of Genoa